The 21st Legislative Assembly of Ontario was convened following the 1943 Ontario general election and was in session from August 4, 1943, until March 24, 1945, just prior to the 1945 general election. The Ontario Progressive Conservative Party, formerly the Ontario Conservative Party, led by George Drew formed a minority government. The Liberals, having lost seats to both the Conservatives and the Co-operative Commonwealth Federation, fell to third place.

William James Stewart served as speaker for the assembly.

Members elected to the Assembly

Timeline

References

External links
Members in Parliament 21

Terms of the Legislative Assembly of Ontario
1943 establishments in Ontario
1945 disestablishments in Ontario